Hippoloetis rufus is a species of beetle in the family Carabidae, the only species in the genus Hippoloetis.

References

Harpalinae
Beetles described in 1834